Immanuel Lutheran Church is a historic church in rural Perkins County, South Dakota. It is situated near the community of Zeona, South Dakota. The church was built in 1923. It was added to the National Register of Historic Places in 1987.

References

Lutheran churches in South Dakota
Churches on the National Register of Historic Places in South Dakota
Churches completed in 1923
Churches in Perkins County, South Dakota
National Register of Historic Places in Perkins County, South Dakota